Cowley County (county code CL) is a county located in the U.S. state of Kansas.  As of the 2020 census, the county population was 34,549. Its county seat is Winfield, and its most populous city is Arkansas City.

History

For millennia, the land now known as Kansas was inhabited by Native Americans.  The first European visitor to Kansas was the Spanish explorer Francisco Vasquez de Coronado in 1541. In 1601, the Governor of New Mexico, Juan de Oñate, visited Etzanoa, a settlement of several thousand Wichita people near Arkansas City along the Walnut River. The ruins of Etzanoa have been found by archaeologists.

19th century
In 1803, most of modern Kansas was secured by the United States as part of the Louisiana Purchase.  In 1854, the Kansas Territory was organized, then in 1861 Kansas became the 34th U.S. state. Cowley County was officially organized as a county, but reserved for the Osage Indians, by the Kansas Legislature in March 1867, originally named Hunter County for Robert Mercer Taliaferro Hunter (1809–1887), a Virginia Representative and Senator to Congress and Speaker of the House in the twenty-sixth Congress.  In 1870, the county was renamed for Matthew Cowley, First Lieutenant in Company I, 9th Kansas Cavalry, who died at Little Rock, Arkansas, on October 7, 1864.  Officially opened for settlement July 15, 1870, there was a lengthy and bitter disagreement between the towns of Winfield and Cresswell (the town now named Arkansas City) over the possession of the county seat of government.  Finally settled after two special elections and numerous petitions to the Governor and Legislature, Winfield was determined to be the county seat and a courthouse was constructed in 1873 at a cost of $11,500.

21st century
In 2010, the Keystone-Cushing Pipeline (Phase II) was constructed north to south through Cowley County.  Controversy arose from the Kansas legislature's decision to grant the pipeline a ten-year exemption from property taxes; it was estimated that this would mean $15 million per year in lost revenue to the six counties through which the pipeline passed. The counties were unsuccessful in an attempt to eliminate the exemption.

Geography

Adjacent counties
 Butler County (north)
 Elk County (northeast)
 Chautauqua County (east)
 Osage County, Oklahoma (south)
 Kay County, Oklahoma (southwest)
 Sumner County (west)
 Sedgwick County (northwest)

Demographics

 

Cowley County comprises the Arkansas City-Winfield, KS Micropolitan Statistical Area, which is included in the Wichita-Arkansas City-Winfield, KS Combined Statistical Area.

As of the U.S. Census in 2000, there were 36,291 people, 14,039 households, and 9,616 families residing in the county. There were 15,673 housing units at an average density of 14 per square mile (5/km2). The racial makeup of the county was 90.13% White, 2.70% Black or African American, 1.96% Native American, 1.53% Asian, 0.01% Pacific Islander, 1.36% from other races, and 2.30% from two or more races. Hispanic or Latino of any race were 3.59% of the population.

There were 14,039 households, out of which 32.20% had children under the age of 18 living with them, 55.20% were married couples living together, 9.60% had a female householder with no husband present, and 31.50% were non-families. 27.90% of all households were made up of individuals, and 13.20% had someone living alone who was 65 years of age or older.  The average household size was 2.46 and the average family size was 3.00.

In the county, the population was spread out, with 26.00% under the age of 18, 9.90% from 18 to 24, 26.00% from 25 to 44, 22.20% from 45 to 64, and 15.90% who were 65 years of age or older.  The median age was 37 years. For every 100 females, there were 95.70 males.  For every 100 females age 18 and over, there were 94.20 males.

The median income for a household in the county was $34,406, and the median income for a family was $43,636. Males had a median income of $31,703 versus $21,341 for females. The per capita income for the county was $17,509.  About 9.20% of families and 12.90% of the population were below the poverty line, including 17.00% of those under age 18 and 11.20% of those age 65 or over.

Government

Presidential elections

Laws
Following amendment to the Kansas Constitution in 1986, the county remained a prohibition, or "dry", county until 1996, when voters approved the sale of alcoholic liquor by the individual drink without a food sales requirement.

The county voted "No" on the 2022 Kansas Value Them Both Amendment, an anti-abortion ballot measure, by 52% to 48% despite backing Donald Trump with 68% of the vote to Joe Biden's 30% in the 2020 presidential election.

Education

Colleges
 Cowley College
 Southwestern College
 St. John's College (closed in 1986)

Unified school districts
 Central USD 462
 Udall USD 463
 Winfield USD 465
 Arkansas City USD 470
 Dexter USD 471

Communities

Cities
 Atlanta
 Arkansas City
 Burden
 Cambridge
 Dexter
 Geuda Springs (partly in Sumner County)
 Parkerfield
 Udall
 Winfield

Unincorporated communities
† means a Census-Designated Place (CDP) by the United States Census Bureau.

 Akron
 Floral
 Grand Summit
 Hackney
 Hooser
 Kellogg
 Maple City
 New Salem†
 Rock†
 Silverdale†
 Tisdale
 Vinton
 Wilmot

Ghost towns
 Etzanoa

Townships
Cowley County is divided into twenty-five townships.  The cities of Arkansas City and Winfield are considered governmentally independent and are excluded from the census figures for the townships.  In the following table, the population center is the largest city (or cities) included in that township's population total, if it is of a significant size.

Notable people
See List of people from Cowley County, Kansas

General Dean Coldwell Strother was a United States Air Force four-star general who served as U.S. Military Representative, NATO Military Committee (USMILREP), from 1962 to 1965; and as Commander in Chief, North American Air Defense Command/Commander in Chief, Continental Air Defense Command (CINCNORAD/CINCONAD), from 1965 to 1966.

Robert Docking was a successful banker and mayor of Arkansas City before he became the 38th Governor of Kansas.

Several college football head coaches have passed through Winfield that have gone on to become widely recognized.  Jerry Kill is the current head coach for the Minnesota Golden Gophers—he played for the Southwestern Moundbuilders under Dennis Franchione when he was head coach.  Jack Mitchell went on to coach several schools including the Kansas Jayhawks.  Former head coach and for the Oklahoma Sooners and College Football Hall of Fame member Bennie Owen was born in Arkansas City.

Perhaps the most famous resident of Cowley County is the fictional character Mary Ann Summers from the television show Gilligan's Island.  It is said on the show that she is "employed at the Winfield General Store."

See also
 National Register of Historic Places listings in Cowley County, Kansas

References

Notes

Further reading

 History of Cowley County Kansas; D.A. Millington / E.P. Greer; Winfield Courier; 162 pages; 1901.
 Hand-book of Arkansas City and surroundings; C. S. Burch Publishing Co; 38 pages; 1887.
 Standard Atlas of Cowley County, Kansas; Geo. A. Ogle & Co; 54 pages; 1905.
 Historical Atlas of Cowley County, Kansas; John P. Edwards; 52 pages; 1882.

External links

County
 
 Cowley County - Directory of Public Officials
Historical
 Cowley County - GenWeb
Maps
 Cowley County Maps: Current, Historic, KDOT
 Kansas Highway Maps: Current, Historic, KDOT
 Kansas Railroad Maps: Current, 1996, 1915, KDOT and Kansas Historical Society

 
Kansas counties
1867 establishments in Kansas
Wichita, KS Metropolitan Statistical Area
Populated places established in 1867